Charlemagne: By the Sword and the Cross is a symphonic metal concept album by actor and singer Christopher Lee. It was released on 15 March 2010. This was Lee's first full-length album in the genre, having previously worked with such bands as Rhapsody of Fire and Manowar.

It tells the story of Charlemagne, the first Holy Roman Emperor, to whom Lee can trace his ancestry. The album's promotional MySpace page garnered over 20 million hits from around the world. The album features 2 metal bands, and a number of guest vocalists playing the different roles in the story. Music was composed by Marco Sabiu. A music video for "The Bloody Verdict of Verden" was released in June 2012.

A heavy metal follow-up album, titled Charlemagne: The Omens of Death, was released in 2013.

Track listing 
All lyrics written by Marie-Claire Calvet, all music composed by Marco Sabiu.
"Overture" – 2:53
Act I:
"Intro" – 1:34
"King of the Franks" – 7:14
Act II:
"Intro" – 1:46
"The Iron Crown of Lombardy" – 8:12
Act III:
"Intro" – 3:26
"The Bloody Verdict of Verden" – 6:16
Act IV:
"Intro" – 2:31
"The Age of Oneness Out of Diversity" – 6:07
Act V:
"Intro" – 2:09
Starlight – 4:40
"Finale" – 3:57
"Iberia" – 5:10
"The Bloody Verdict of Verden" (Instrumental) – 6:20

Personnel

Vocals
 Christopher Lee – Charlemagne (Ghost)
 Vincent Ricciardi – Charlemagne (Young)
 Lydia Salnikova – Hildegard 
 Christina Lee – narration
 Phil SP – Pepin the Short
 Mauro Conti – Pope Hadrian
 Christi Ebenhoch – storytelling singer
 Dave "Grav" Cavill – additional vocals
 John Wistow – backing vocals
 European Cinematic Symphony Choir – choir

Musicians
 Tony Newton – bass
 Corrado Canonici – double bass
 Ollie Usiskin – drums
 Chris Jones – electric guitar
 Matt Pearce – electric guitar
 Raffaello Gentili – electric guitar
 Leigh Alexandra – keyboards
 European Cinematic Symphony Orchestra – orchestra

Production
 Juan Aneiros – production
 Monica Tong – assistant production
 Juan Ramirez – co-production
 Corrado Canonici – executive production
 Andy Jackson – engineering, mastering
 Marco Sabiu – orchestration, conducting
 Mauro Conti – management vocal consulting

References

External links

2010 albums
Christopher Lee albums
Concept albums
Cultural depictions of Charlemagne